Monday is a 2000 Japanese comedy thriller drama film directed by Sabu. The film was featured at the 2000 Berlin Film Festival and won the FIPRESCI Award "for its austere, dark wit and keen eye for human foibles."

Plot
Takagi (Shinichi Tsutsumi), a seemingly average Japanese businessman, wakes up in a hotel room but doesn't know how he wound up there. When a packet of "purification salt" falls out of his pocket, he starts having memories of a funeral and a meeting with a yakuza boss. Soon he finds out he is in deep trouble.

Cast
 Shin'ichi Tsutsumi as Koichi Takagi
 Yasuko Matsuyuki as Yuko Kirishima 
 Ren Ohsugi as Murai Yoshio 
 Masanobu Andō as Mitsuo Kondo 
 Hideki Noda as Shingo Kamiyama 
 Akira Yamamoto as Kiichiro Hanai 
 Naomi Nishida as Yuki Machida
 Susumu Terajima as Saburô Nakano

Reception
The New York Times found that "'Monday' has some of Sabu’s sharpest satire" and "offers a lot of stylish parody as it tracks the increasingly grim trajectory of the salaryman’s lost weekend." Derek Elley in Variety wrote that "Sabu makes a stunning return to form with "Monday," his fourth and best movie to date."

References

External links
 

2000s Japanese-language films
2000 films
Films directed by Sabu
Yakuza films
2000s Japanese films